Jorge Tapia (born 10 April 1949) is an Ecuadorian footballer. He played in four matches for the Ecuador national football team from 1973 to 1975. He was also part of Ecuador's squad for the 1975 Copa América tournament.

References

1949 births
Living people
Ecuadorian footballers
Ecuador international footballers
Place of birth missing (living people)
Association football midfielders
L.D.U. Quito footballers